Kacey Carrig (born April 10, 1992) is an American model.

Career
Carrig was raised in Shamong Township, New Jersey. During his college education he decided to pursue a modelling career and contacted some agencies. Ford agency asked him to enter the "VMan 2011 model search", in which he became a finalist and subsequently got a contract.

In 2012, Versace enlisted him for the brand's F/W ’12 campaign. Since then, he has worked for a number of editorial ad campaigns and modeled for shows like Mert & Marcus, Ermano Scervino, Italian GQ, and Parke & Ronen. He has also modeled for Bloomingdale's, Milan Vukmirovic, Chevignon and Tom Ford. Carrig is a Business Marketing major at the College of New Jersey.

References

External links
 http://www.details.com/blogs/daily-details/2013/10/model-in-the-spotlight-kacey-carrig.html
 http://worldofmodels.org/kaceycarrig/
 http://www.tee-vanity.com/?page_id=8280
 https://web.archive.org/web/20131202230547/http://www.dmanagementgroup.com/scroll.asp?tipo=dmen&qualemod=564

Male models from New Jersey
1992 births
Living people
People from Shamong Township, New Jersey